In Search of The Ultra-Sex is the English subtitled version of A la Recherche de l'Ultra-Sex, a 2015 French comedy film written, directed, edited and overdubbed by the comedy duo Nicolas & Bruno composed by Nicolas Charlet and Bruno Lavaine.

Plot
Science-fiction comedy of the XXX kind, In Search of The Ultra-Sex is inspired by a true story : A pandemic infects people everywhere with infinite lust, and the only ones who can save planet Earth are a group of astronauts in space, led by Captain Cock, desperately looking for a solution!

As the Galactic Confederation desperately tries to understand the reason behind this sudden madness, the horrifying truth is discovered by the FBI agents Bambi Darling and Stormy Brushing : The sexual matrix of the Universe known as the Ultra-Sex has been stolen! On board of starship "4skin 5", Captain Cock and his crew are missioned to solve the mystery and save Planet Earth from an endless orgy!

About the film
In Search of the Ultra-Sex (initially titled  Message of Pornographic Nature : In Search of the Ultra-Sex) is a passion project for creators Nicolas Charlet and Bruno Lavaine who, to mark the anniversary of French channel Canal Plus in 2014, delved into the archives to create this cinematographic UFO: a crazy mach-up of around a hundred of (non explicit) excerpts from 100% pure vintage porn movies from the 70's and 80's, of which they re-dubbed all the characters, both male and female. Renewing the movie-hijacking tradition begun with Woody Allen's "What's Up, Tiger Lily?", In Search of Ultra-Sex is a hilarious, absurd, hallucinatory and very original journey into the best (and worst!) of porn golden-age gems, twisted on the same principle as their previous TV-show for Canal Plus, Message à Caractère Informatif, in which they used to overdub corporate movies.

But the fate of the film went far beyond a special TV broadcast and met an unexpected success in France.

In November 2014, after two exceptional screenings of the film at the Museum of Modern Art Palais de Tokyo in Paris, followed up with a Master Class before an audience of 500 people, the ARP (Actors, Directors and Producers Corporation), headed by Michel Hazanavicius, organizes a double special screening of Michel Hazanavicius's La Classe américaine and a new re-edited and remastered version of the Ultra-Sex for theaters.

On June 5, 2015, a great evening event is organized around the film at the mythical Max Linder Panorama cinema, with animation provided by the Nicolas & Bruno themselves and a dubbing demonstration live by the famous French porn star Tabatha Cash and dubbing French actors Patrick Poivey (Bruce Willis), Lionel Henry (Eddy Murphy), Eric Missoffe (Scooby Doo) and Gilbert Levy (Moe The Simpsons), in front of 650 people. The Max Linder Panorama is sold out.

In France, many theaters request to show the film, many extending it with a choreography of Daft-Peunk Robot (a character of the film) and a workshop where the public can come and try dubbing extracts of the Ultra-Sex.

This is the beginning of a great tour: the Ultra-Sex-Tour. The film quickly becomes a cult-phenomenon, gathering a real fan community all around France. Everywhere, theaters program the movie, with sold-out projections in Lyon (outdoors at Transborder), Amiens, Poitiers, Marseilles, Metz, Montpellier, Villeneuve d'Ascq, Gueret, Lausanne, Avignon, Dunkerque, Toulouse, etc., and the Luminor in Paris where the film is in residence every Saturday evening from June, 2015.

November 2015, the mythical parisian theater Studio Galande programs In Search of the Ultra-Sex every Friday and Saturday night in residence, just before The Rocky Horror Picture Show, screened there for 35 years. The programmation continued at the Parisian theater Le Luminor Hotel de Ville every Saturday night during summer 2016 and 2017.

It is subtitled in 9 languages: German / English / Spanish / French / Italian / Japanese / Polish / Portuguese / Russian.

In various interviews, Nicolas & Bruno have mentioned that they wish to release an American English dubbed version of the film.

Festivals 
The film had a good reception outside France and was featured in several festivals, including:

 Fantastic Fest of Austin (Texas), 
 Beyond Fest of Hollywood at the American Cinematheque, 
 Ithaca International Fantastic Film Festival (New York), 
 Grolandais International Film Festival of Toulouse
 Buttocks Film Festival of Paris (as closing film)
 Bordeaux Independent International Film Festival
 Französische Filmtage Tübingen of Stuttgart
 Zinema Zombie Fest of Bogota, 
 Offscreen Festival of Brussels, 
 Florida Film Festival of Maitland, 
 Cinedelphia Film Festival of Philadelphia
 Crossing Europe Film Festival of Linz, 
 Slash 1/2 Festival of Vienna, 
 Haapsalu Horror and Fantasy Film Festival of Tallinn,
 Bucheon Fantastic International Film Festival of Seoul
 BAFICI of Buenos Aires, 
 Fantasia festival of Montreal
 Valletta film festival in Malta 
 Sci-Fi London Film Festival.
 My French Film Festival  in the "Midnight screenings" category

Critical response 
Since its first broadcast on Canal + and its projection at the Palais de Tokyo for the 30th anniversary of the channel, the film received very encouraging reviews: Les Inrockuptibles said: "the new crazy dubbed mach-up by the funniest duo in the country", while Le Monde said: "a guaranteed permanent burst of laughter". "An exhilarating return to their roots" according to So Film, in a long interview Nicolas & Bruno gave to the magazine. 

Télérama magazine stated: "The story imagined by the two brats Charlet and Lavaine is an excuse for all sorts of tomfooleries", but specifies : "... much more funny than arousing!". 

The press seems to enjoy this unexpected and new mix of genres, L'Express magazine said: "Through their film, Nicolas & Bruno celebrate not only the porn culture but also that of artistic hijacking". 

Libération Didier Péron stated: "a kitsch and crazy cinematographic hijacking, a sci-fi nutty pastiche". "American actresses hairstyles of the 80s are pornographic in itself, it's another world!" points out Frederic Taddeï who interviewed Nicolas & Bruno on Europe-1 radio station, "It's a tribute to porn American cinema, as did Hazanavicius's The Artist with Hollywood movies". For Le Nouvel Obs magazine, "In search of the ultra-sex is a full of humor jewelry-box filled with sex maniac robots, unusual sex, absurd references and unbelievable blow-dries... go see it!" For his part, Vice highly recommends the film and explains how "putting a tape into a VCR and talk over it can have a huge humorous reach". An "Unidentified Filmic Object" according to AlloCiné and Le Mouv' radio, "Nicolas & Bruno turn off the sound and let their delirious imaginations fly... script, dialogues, editing and even over-dubbing, these two guys can do almost everything."

Critics also commented on the programming and success of the film all around France and on the activities that accompanied it. On France-Inter Radio, Rebecca Manzoni stated: "a both fascinating and hilarious undertaking, a singular destiny in the film industry : the movie lives its life in theaters, without any promotion, and owes its success just to the word of mouth." A destiny largely relayed by the most followed bloggers: "A contagious film with hilarious punchlines, a killingly funny showing" acclaims GentleGeek, precising that "sharing and collective experience are part of the success of the film." Super by Timai describes "600 people laughing non-stop for an hour and a half" about the special projection of the film at the Max Linder movie-theater, "the most WTF movie I've ever seen!" SuperBobine writes about an "unconventional adventure, a real gem of cinematographic hijacking." "In search of the Ultra-Sex is a high-concentrate of LOL Blue and Z-movie, absolutely joyous!" posts the blogger Alexandre Hervaud. For his part, Oero33 order his readers to "go and see In search of the Ultra-Sex, preferably with friends!". For the first anniversary of the film, Brigitte Baronnet from AlloCiné salutes its programing in residence at "the mythical parisian movie-theater Studio Galande, just before the eternal Rocky Horror Picture Show."

Time Out describes this "porn-stache gem" as a "priceless mashup, filled with Godardian editing, dirty irony and hairy surrealism", and the Swiss La Liberté reports "one hour in fits of laughter". After watching it at the Fantastic Fest of Austin, The Daily Beast headlines "Inside the Year’s Craziest Sci-Fi Sex Flick!", and depicts "a brilliantly deranged 60-minutes space saga whose genius lies in its conception as a pasted-together pastiche of great-bad Golden Age porn, but how Charlet and Lavaine do the deed is a masterstroke in itself." Twitch Film describes "one of the most unique and hilarious cinematic experiences of 2015, both smarter and dumber than it sounds." FanboyNation magazine hails "a craft at hand in the editing as well as the absurd overdubs" in this "ultimate sex tape supercut". For his part, web-magazine PopOptiq headlines "Hilarious, raunchy, and extremely hairy, the #ULTRASEX is the perfect midnight aphrodisiac!". 

After the showing of the film at the American Cinematheque of Los Angeles, The Hollywood Reporter stated: "Only here, though, will viewers get to hear the Queen of England impatiently tell an aide, "Cut the salamu-alaykums, find me dwarves to f---."

Extensions of the film 
In November 2016, Nova Edition published a "Boovie" (book+movie) "A la Recherche de l'Ultra-sex", 208 pages, limited edition.

Nicolas & Bruno created an "Ultrasex Recipe" in collaboration with French chief Iñaki Aizpitarte and an "Ultrasex Cocktail" with Eric Fossard.

From November 2016 to January 2017, at the Clémentine de la Feronnière Gallery in Paris, 
the duet presented an unreleased photographic series inspired by one of the characters of the film: "Robot Daft Peunk- First Step on Earth".

The exhibition then started an international tour in Belgium, at the Relief Gallery in Brussels. Then in Namur, August 2017, as part of a Carte Blanche given to the two directors-photographers, at the Festival de l'Intime.

Cast
• Nicolas & Bruno as all characters voices.

References

External links
 In Search of the Ultra-Sex Trailer 
 In Search of the Ultra-Sex Official Facebook
  
 Synecdoche Films, Producer's Facebook

2015 films
French comedy films